Samarahan is a district, in Samarahan Division, Sarawak, Malaysia.

References